Chinese slang may refer to:

Mandarin Chinese profanity
Cantonese profanity
Diu (Cantonese)
Chinese Internet slang